NIEA may refer to:

National Indian Education Association
Nazarene International Education Association
NieA_7 anime title and character
Northern Ireland Environment Agency
National Indie Excellence Awards